These are the Billboard Hot 100 number-one hits of 1981. The longest running number-one single of 1981 is "Physical" by Olivia Newton-John which stayed at the top of the chart for six weeks in 1981 and then for four additional weeks in 1982, with a total of 10 weeks at number-one. This also makes "Physical" the longest running number-one single of the 1980s.

That year, 10 acts hit number one for the first time, such as Kool & the Gang, Dolly Parton, Eddie Rabbitt, REO Speedwagon, Sheena Easton, Kim Carnes, Stars on 45, Air Supply, and Rick Springfield. Lionel Richie, already having hit number one with The Commodores, also receives his first number one song as a solo act. Blondie and Daryl Hall and John Oates were the only acts to hit number one more than once, with both acts hitting twice.

Chart history

Number-one artists

See also
1981 in music
Cashbox Top 100 number-one singles of 1981
List of Billboard number-one singles
List of number-one albums of 1981 (U.S.)

References

Sources
Fred Bronson's Billboard Book of Number 1 Hits, 5th Edition
Joel Whitburn's Top Pop Singles 1955-2008, 12 Edition
Joel Whitburn Presents the Billboard Hot 100 Charts: The Eighties
Additional information obtained can be verified within Billboard's online archive services and print editions of the magazine.

1981 record charts
1981